The Darden School of Business is the graduate business school of the University of Virginia, a public research university in Charlottesville, Virginia. The Darden School offers MBA, PhD, and Executive Education programs. The school was founded in 1955 and is named after Colgate Whitehead Darden Jr., a former Democratic congressman, governor of Virginia, and former president of the University of Virginia. Darden is on the grounds of the University of Virginia in Charlottesville. It uses the case method as its sole method of teaching. The dean of the school is former McKinsey & Company executive Scott C. Beardsley.

History
The Darden School was the first graduate school of business of the Southern United States when it was founded in 1955. The original business school was nestled in the central grounds of the University of Virginia, before being moved its current location at the North Grounds. Designed by the Driehaus Prize winner Robert A. M. Stern, the Darden school's buildings feature sand-struck Virginia brick, Chippendale balustrades and red-metal standing seam roofs. In 2018, the Sands Family Grounds was inaugurated by the Darden School, in Arlington County, Virginia, in proximity to Washington D.C.'s central business district. The Sands Family Grounds occupy the top two floors of a 31-story skyscraper emblazoned with the UVA Darden Logo, and provides extensive facilities for students and event guests.

Locations 
The full-time MBA program is located in Charlottesville, Virginia at the UVA Darden Goodwin Family Grounds, which is roughly two hours from Washington, D.C.

In 2017, it was announced that Darden would establish dedicated facilities in Rosslyn, formerly introduced as the UVA Darden Sands Family Grounds in February 2019, as the new home base for the Executive MBA formats and new M.S. in Business Analytics degree launched with the McIntire School of Commerce.

MBA
Designed for students who seek to strengthen their leadership, business and communication skills, Darden's two-year MBA program combines core and elective courses in Charlottesville, Virginia with opportunities for every student to study abroad.

Admissions

Admission requirements for the MBA include an earned four-year bachelor's degree from an accredited U.S. institution or the international equivalent, completion of application forms and essays, GMAT or GRE score, academic transcripts, two professional recommendations, and the payment of a fee. The MBA Class of 2021 has an average GMAT score of 713 and an average GPA of 3.48, and an average age of 27 years old. Of the 335 students enrolled, 33% are international students, 40% are women and 21% are domestic minority students. The School had an acceptance rate of 36.5% as of 2019.

Employment statistics
A total of 97% of MBA graduates from the class of 2019 received full-time offers within three months of graduation, the median starting salary and sign-on bonus upon graduation was $162,000. Among the graduates, 36% entered consulting positions, 24% obtained investment banking and financial services roles, and 15% entered careers in technologies.

Study abroad
Students are offered study abroad programs as well as Darden Worldwide Courses which offer international immersion courses which are funded by a $15 million gift from philanthropist and donor, Frank Batten.

Executive MBA formats 
Designed with a hybrid structure of online learning with in-person residences at the new UVA Darden Sands Family Grounds in the Washington, D.C., area, two formats of the MBA are offered which provide the same degree as the MBA. The EMBA (Executive MBA) is designed for working professionals and the GEMBA (Global Executive MBA) is an option that provides additional global residences compared to the EMBA. Both formats have the same core curriculum over a period of twenty-one months with all students entering in the same cohort each academic year. Global residencies include Brazil, Chile, China, Germany, Japan, Ghana, Israel, India, Estonia and Cuba with changes in locations possible each year.

Darden Executive Education
The inaugural Executive Education program was offered in 1955. Darden Executive Education offers both short courses and custom solutions, as well as consortia, corporate university design and development, and industry specific partnerships. Short course focus areas include leadership, general management, strategy and decision-making, negotiation, growth and innovation, project management, sales and marketing, financial management and corporate aviation.

Rankings

Darden is regularly ranked as being among the Top 15 business schools in the U.S. and Top 30 in the world. Its current rankings are as follows:

MBA rankings
 #5 Bloomberg Businessweek 2019
 #11 U.S. News & World Report 2021
 #13 Forbes 2019
 #16 (North America) - The Economist 2019
 #16 (Global) - The Economist 2019

MBA Specialty rankings
 #1 Best Professors - The Princeton Review 2019
#2 Best MBA For Consulting - The Princeton Review 2019
#2 Best MBA For Management - The Princeton Review 2019
#4 Best Campus Environment - The Princeton Review 2019
#6 Entrepreneurship - The Princeton Review for Entrepreneur magazine 2019
#1 Education Experience in United States - The Economist 2019
#1 Corporate Social Responsibility - Financial Times 2019
#1 General Management - Financial Times 2016
#2 Learning - Bloomberg Businessweek 2019
 #11 Career Services Rank - Financial Times 2019

Executive Education rankings
 #1 Course Design (Global) - Financial Times 2003-2010
 #1 Faculty (Global) - Financial Times 2004-2011
#7 Facilities (Global) - Financial Times 2019
 #20 Open-Enrollment Programs (Global) - Financial Times 2019
 #52 Custom Programs (Global) - Financial Times 2019

Notable alumni
Darden's list of alumni includes:

John H. Bryan (MBA '60), CEO and Chairman of Sara Lee from 1976 to 2001
Robert Citrone (MBA '90) co-founder of Discovery Capital Management
George David (MBA '67), CEO and Chairman of United Technologies Corporation
Bill Hawkins (MBA '82), former President and CEO, Medtronic Inc.; CEO, Immucor Inc.
Robert J. Hugin (MBA '85), CEO of Celgene Corporation
Lewis F. Payne, Jr. (MBA '73), former Virginia congressman
Steven Reinemund (MBA '78), former CEO and Chairman of PepsiCo.
Mark Sanford (MBA '88), former Governor of South Carolina
Steve Silbiger (MBA '90), author, The Ten-Day MBA, HarperCollins
Hal Lawton (MBA ‘96), President & CEO, Tractor Supply
John Strangfeld (MBA '77), Chairman and CEO, Prudential Financial
Mark B. Templeton (MBA '78), President and CEO, Citrix Systems Inc.

List of deans

See also
Economics
Glossary of economics
List of United States business school rankings
List of business schools in the United States
List of Atlantic Coast Conference business schools

References

Business schools in Virginia
University of Virginia schools
Educational institutions established in 1954
1954 establishments in Virginia
Life sciences industry
New Classical architecture
Robert A. M. Stern buildings